Veera Shankar is an Indian film director who works in Telugu and Kannada films.

Early life and career
Veera Sanker is a director, writer and producer in Telugu and Kannada film industries. He made his directorial debut in 1997 with Hello ! I Love You film starring Srikanth and Sadhika. This film was based on the famous novel “Vennello Aadapilla” by Yandamuri Veerendranath. The film won the State Award for Best Editing.

His next films Premakosam, Vijaya Ramaraju won three State Awards. His big break came when he directed Pawan Kalyan’s Gudumba Shankar, a family entertainer. He made Puneeth Rajkumar’s Namma Basava was huge success and ran 100 days in many centers. He directed and produced in addition to writing story and screenplay. His next project was Anthu Inthu Preeti Banthu. Later on, he directed and produced the Telugu film Mana Kurralle released on 1st Jan, 2015. He served as President of Telugu Film Directors Association during 2014–2018.

Filmography 

As actor

 Jathi Ratnalu (2021)
 Oka Chinna Family Story (2021)
 Virata Parvam (2022)
 Gandharwa (2022)
 Bujji Ila Raa (2022)

References

External links
 

Telugu film directors
Telugu film producers
Telugu screenwriters
Living people
Screenwriters from Andhra Pradesh
Film directors from Andhra Pradesh
Film producers from Andhra Pradesh
20th-century Indian film directors
21st-century Indian film directors
Year of birth missing (living people)